was a train station on the Sasayama Line in Fukusumi, Taki, Taki District, Hyogo, Japan. It closed in 1972. It is also a bus stop of Keihan Kyoto Kotsu and Shinki Green Bus.

Line
 Japan National Railway
 Sasayama Line

Layout
The station featured was one platform with one track.

Adjacent stations

Bus routes

Enjo Line has run since 1934. It altered Sasayama Line, which did not extend to Sonobe Station. It had been operated by JNR Bus and West JR Bus until 2002. This bus route was transferred to Shinki Bus and after that transferred to Keihan Bus.

References

External links

Railway stations in Japan opened in 1944
Railway stations closed in 1972
Railway stations in Hyōgo Prefecture